The 1991 NFL season was the 72nd regular season of the National Football League (NFL). It was the final season for coach Chuck Noll. The season ended with Super Bowl XXVI when the Washington Redskins defeated the Buffalo Bills, 37–24, at the Metrodome in Minnesota. This was the second of four consecutive Super Bowl losses for Buffalo.

Player movement

Transactions
March 26, 1991: Ronnie Lott signs with the Los Angeles Raiders as a Plan B Free Agent. 
April 2, 1991: Roger Craig signs with the Los Angeles Raiders as a Plan B Free Agent.
August 27: The Green Bay Packers sign punter Rick Tuten, who appeared in Super Bowl XXV with the Buffalo Bills.
September 19: The Phoenix Cardinals sign quarterback Stan Gelbaugh, who led the London Monarchs to the World Bowl '91. 
September 19: The Philadelphia Eagles sign Wide Receiver Roy Green. 
September 21: The Pittsburgh Steelers sign quarterback Rick Strom. 
September 21: The San Diego Chargers sign Wide Receiver Yancey Thigpen. 
September 26 : The San Francisco 49ers sign Defensive End Jim Burt.

Trades
July 22: The Atlanta Falcons traded Defensive Tackle Tony Casillas to the Dallas Cowboys. 
August 14: The Los Angeles Raiders traded Vencie Glenn to the New Orleans Saints
August 19: The New Orleans Saints traded Robert Massey to the Phoenix Cardinals 
August 21: The New Orleans Saints traded wide receiver Brett Perriman to the Detroit Lions 
August 27: The Green Bay Packers traded kicker Brad Daluiso to the Atlanta Falcons 
August 27: The Los Angeles Raiders traded quarterback Steve Beuerlein to the Dallas Cowboys
August 28: The Chargers traded quarterback Billy Joe Tolliver to the Atlanta Falcons
September 11: The Seattle Seahawks traded kicker Norm Johnson to the Atlanta Falcons.

Retirements
Four-time Super Bowl champion Mike Webster announced his retirement on March 11, 1991 after a 17-year career with a total of 245 games played at center.

Draft

The 1991 NFL Draft was held from April 21 to 22, 1991 at New York City's Marriott Marquis. With the first pick, the Dallas Cowboys selected defensive tackle Russell Maryland from the University of Miami.

Officiating changes
Art McNally resigned as the league's Director of Officiating during the offseason. He had held the position since 1968. Longtime NFL referee Jerry Seeman, who worked the previous season's Super Bowl XXV, was named as McNally's replacement.

Jim Tunney retired after 31 years as an NFL official. He remains the only referee to have worked consecutive Super Bowls (XI, and XII).

Gene Barth died on October 11, 1991. For the remainder of the 1991 season, NFL officials wore a black armband on their left sleeve with the white number 14 to honor him.

Bernie Kukar, Larry Nemmers (the side judge for Super Bowl XXV), and Stan Kemp were promoted to referee to replace Barth, Seeman, and Tunney.

Major rule changes
Source:  Total Football: The Official Encyclopedia of the National Football League. pp 1583–1592.
The definition of a drop kick, field goal, and punt is modified: all three can only be attempted from behind the line of scrimmage.
If a foul by a player causes an injury to an opponent, a team time out will not be charged to the penalized team anytime during the game instead of only during the last two minutes of a half/overtime.
The game clock will not start until the next snap following any change of possession, even if the player went out of bounds.
Officials will immediately blow the play dead when a defensive player is offsides before the snap and clearly rushes beyond the offensive line in such a way that he becomes an unabated threat to the quarterback.
A touchback will be ruled when a player fumbles the ball in the field of play and it goes out of bounds in the opponent's end zone.
A touchback, not a safety, will also be ruled when a player fumbles the ball in his own end zone and the opponent is the one that knocks the fumble out of bounds in the end zone.
An offensive player cannot deliberately bat a backward pass forward.

1991 deaths
Ollie Spencer
Jimmy Strausbaugh
Sid Youngelman

Members of the Pro Football Hall of Fame
Paul Brown: Brown died on August 5, 1991 at home of complications from pneumonia. A longtime coach of the Cleveland Browns and co-founder of the Cincinnati Bengals in 1968, also serving as their first coach, Brown was inducted into the Pro Football Hall of Fame in 1967.
Red Grange: Grange developed Parkinson's disease and died on January 28, 1991, in Lake Wales, Florida. Joining the Chicago Bears in 1925, Grange, a charter member of both the College and Pro Football Halls of Fame, also became the first person other than the game referee to toss the coin at a Super Bowl.

Preseason

American Bowl
A series of National Football League pre-season exhibition games that were held at sites outside the United States, a total of three games were contested.

Regular season

Scheduling formula

Highlights of the 1991 season included:
Thanksgiving: Two games were played on Thursday, November 28, featuring Chicago at Detroit and Pittsburgh at Dallas, with Detroit and Dallas winning.

Final standings

Tiebreakers
N.Y. Jets finished ahead of Miami in the AFC East based on head-to-head sweep (2–0).
Chicago was the first NFC Wild Card based on better conference record than Dallas (9–3 to Cowboys’ 8–4).
Atlanta finished ahead of San Francisco in the NFC West based on head-to-head sweep (2–0), and was the third NFC Wild Card ahead of Philadelphia based on better conference record (7–5 to Eagles’ 6–6).

Playoffs

Records, milestones, and notable statistics
Week 8
 October 21: James Lofton became the oldest player to record 200 yards receiving as well as 200 yards from scrimmage in a game (35 years, 108 days), as the Buffalo Bills defeated the Cincinnati Bengals by a 35–16 final.

Awards

Coaching changes

Offseason
 Cleveland Browns: Bill Belichick was named the permanent replacement, after Bud Carson was fired after the first nine games of 1990, and Jim Shofner served as interim for the final seven games.
 New England Patriots: Dick MacPherson replaced the fired Rod Rust.
 New York Giants: Bill Parcells resigned following the team's Super Bowl XXV victory, and was replaced by Ray Handley.
 Philadelphia Eagles: Rich Kotite was hired after the team opted to not renew Buddy Ryan's contract.
 Tampa Bay Buccaneers: Richard Williamson became the permanent head coach, after serving as interim for the final three games of 1990 following the firing of Ray Perkins.

In-season

 Indianapolis Colts: Ron Meyer was fired after five games, and Rick Venturi then served as interim for the final 11 games.

Uniform changes
The NFL shield was added to the yoke of the jerseys and the left thigh of the pants. The NFL shield was also added to the right breast of the officiating uniforms.
 The New England Patriots switched from white face masks to red.
 The Washington Redskins switched from big block numbers to  skinnier font size numbers.
The San Francisco 49ers removed white stripes on red socks. 
Just before the start of training camp, owner Eddie DeBartolo unveiled a new helmet logo with "49ers" in a modern font, replacing the interlocking "SF" which had been on the team's helmets since 1962. After severe fan backlash, DeBartolo reversed course two days later.

Television
This was the second year under the league's four-year broadcast contracts with ABC, CBS, NBC, TNT, and ESPN. ABC, CBS, and NBC continued to televise Monday Night Football, the NFC package, the AFC package, respectively. Sunday night games aired on TNT during the first half of the season, and ESPN during the second half of the season.

External links
Football Outsiders: DVOA 1991

References 

 NFL Record and Fact Book
 NFL History 1991–2000  
 Total Football: The Official Encyclopedia of the National Football League
 1991 NFL season at Pro Football Reference

National Football League seasons
 
National Football League